Loberg or Løberg is a surname. Notable people with the surname include:

Claes Loberg (born 1970), Swedish-born Australian technology entrepreneur and designer
Edwin A. Loberg (1915-2004), American colonel
Frode Løberg (born 1963), Norwegian biathlete
Liv Løberg (born 1949), Norwegian politician
Sverre Løberg (1905–1976), Norwegian politician